Alive Again may refer to:

"Alive Again" (Chicago song), 1978
"Alive Again" (Cher song), 2002
Alive Again (Nightingale album), 2003
Alive Again (Nuclear Assault album), 2003
Alive Again (Matt Maher album), 2009
Alive Again (The Neal Morse Band album), 2016

See also
 Live Again (disambiguation)